Robin Nicholas Stuart Hobbs (born 8 May 1942) is a former English cricketer, who played in seven Tests for England from 1967 to 1971.  He played first-class cricket for both Essex and Glamorgan.

Cricket writer, Colin Bateman, remarked, "Hobbs was the last specialist leg-spinner to play for England before Ian Salisbury revived the art in 1992. A good spinner of the ball although he lacked the googly, an inventive batsman and great character, he was an immensely popular cricketer".

Life and career
Leg spinners have proved a rarity in post-war English cricket, thanks in part to the rise of one day cricket, and Hobbs was the last specialist to play for England before the emergence of Ian Salisbury.

Hobbs was born in Chippenham, Wiltshire but after moving to Scotland for a period during the war he grew up in Dagenham in East London. A keen ornithologist, Robin collected tropical birds in an aviary that he built behind his father's shop. This notably included a toucan which he named Terry. He made his debut for Essex in 1961 and for England in 1967, but his well flighted leg breaks failed to discomfort Indian and Pakistani batsmen raised on spin.  His batting was unregarded, making his 44-minute century against the touring Australians in 1975, all the more remarkable.

After fourteen years with Essex, Hobbs retired to minor county cricket with Suffolk, before re-emerging four years later after being invited to captain Glamorgan. He was Glamorgan captain in 1979 (a year in which the county didn't win a first class match) then played two more seasons under the captaincy of Malcolm Nash. He returned to Suffolk for the 1982 season, then retired.

He was the last English leg spin bowler to take 1,000 first-class wickets in his career.  In all he took 1,099 scalps, with a best of 8 for 63 at an average of 27.09.  An economy rate of 2.86 is testament to his accuracy, while a strike rate of 56.7 ranks with any spinner of his generation.

References

Further reading
Rob Kelly, Hobbsy: A Life in Cricket, Von Krumm Publishing, 2018

External links

 The other Hobbs - the last of his line?

1942 births
Living people
England Test cricketers
English cricketers
Essex cricketers
Glamorgan cricketers
Glamorgan cricket captains
International Cavaliers cricketers
Suffolk cricketers
Minor Counties cricketers
Marylebone Cricket Club cricketers
D. H. Robins' XI cricketers
T. N. Pearce's XI cricketers
Young England cricketers
Marylebone Cricket Club Under-25s cricketers
Marylebone Cricket Club President's XI cricketers